Nikos Pateras is a Greek major shipowner, president (from 2008 to 2010) and shareholder of Panathinaikos FC.

He is member of the Pateras family, a historic shipping family from Chios island. He is president of Pacific & Atlantic Corporation which possesses a fleet of 50 bulk carriers containers.

His father, Diamantis, was general manager of the team of Panathinaikos that reached the 1971 European Cup Final.

Nikos Pateras has been the owner of many yachts.

Today, Nikolaos D. Pateras is the head of the container ship management company Contships. Contships is the world's largest independent shipowner of feeder containerships, with a transport capacity of 900-1,500 TEUs. Contships Management's fleet consists of 46 feeder containerships.

References

External links
 Pateras foundation
Nikos Pateras: One of the new phenomena of Greek shipowning mediashipping.gr

Living people
Businesspeople from Chios
Greek football chairmen and investors
Greek businesspeople in shipping
Panathinaikos A.O.
Panathinaikos F.C.
Panathinaikos F.C. presidents
1963 births